Al-Bateha is a subject of Baladiyah al-Batha and one of the oldest neighborhoods in southern Riyadh, Saudi Arabia, located between Jabrah and Manfuhah al-Jadidah.

References

Neighbourhoods in Riyadh
Economy of Riyadh
Shopping districts and streets